"Just a Friend 2002" is a song by American R&B singer Mario, written by Warryn "Baby Dubb" Campbell, Harold Lilly, John Smith, and Biz Markie. It is a loose cover of Markie's hit "Just a Friend" and was the first single released from Mario's self-titled debut album. Mario's version is different, as the story is changed from a man who discovers his girlfriend has been cheating on him to a story about unrequited love. Produced by Campbell, the song was released in April 2002 and outperformed Markie's 1989 version on the US Billboard Hot 100 chart, peaking at number four on August 24, 2002, while Markie's peaked at number nine.

Background
Although the song's chorus interpolates Biz Markie's "Just a Friend," the stories in the two songs are different. Whereas in Markie's version, the song is about a cheating girlfriend, Mario's version is rather about unrequited love. The song also contains an instrumental sample from Run–D.M.C.'s "Sucker M.C.'s." Usher was given the song and recorded the song and was due to record a music video for the song, it was to be on his unreleased album All About U but when the album was shelved, he passed on the song and it was then given to Mario.

Music video
The video was directed by Diane Martel, which was shot on location in Mario's hometown of Baltimore, Maryland. The video features Mario visiting a girl while his friends want to see her as well. While following her down the street, they lead to a movie theater where she is found, and
Mario excites her with dance. Biz Markie can be seen in parts of the theater and heard in the beginning of the
video. Cassie Ventura is also featured briefly in this video.

Track listings

US CD single
 "Just a Friend 2002" (radio edit)
 "Just a Friend 2002" (Old School mix featuring Biz Markie)
 "Just a Friend 2002" (album version)

US 7-inch single
A. "Just a Friend 2002" (radio edit) – 3:34
B. "Just a Friend 2002" (Biz Markie version) – 4:36

UK CD and 12-inch single
 "Just a Friend 2002" (radio edit) – 3:35
 "Just a Friend 2002" (5AM mix) – 3:39
 "Braid My Hair" – 4:06

European CD single
 "Just a Friend 2002" (radio edit) – 3:35
 "Just a Friend 2002" (Old School mix featuring Biz Markie) – 4:36

Charts

Weekly charts

Year-end charts

Release history

References

Mario (singer) songs
2001 songs
2002 debut singles
J Records singles
Song recordings produced by Warryn Campbell
Songs written by Biz Markie
Songs written by Harold Lilly (songwriter)
Songs written by Warryn Campbell